Brickerville is an unincorporated community and census-designated place (CDP) in Elizabeth Township, Lancaster County, Pennsylvania, United States, with a ZIP code of 17543. The population was 1,309 at the 2010 census.

Geography
U.S. Route 322 (28th Division Highway) passes through the center of town, leading west-northwest  to Harrisburg, the state capital, and southeast  to Ephrata. Pennsylvania Route 501 (Furnace Hills Pike) crosses US 322 in Brickerville, leading north  to Schaefferstown and south  to Lititz.

The community sits on a ridge which drains northeast to Furnace Run, a tributary of Middle Creek, and south to Hammer Creek. Middle Creek and Hammer Creek are tributaries of Cocalico Creek, part of the Conestoga River watershed draining to the Susquehanna River.

Demographics

At the 2000 census there were 1,287 people, 433 households, and 374 families living in the CDP.  The population density was 580.0 people per square mile (223.8/km).  There were 438 housing units at an average density of 197.4/sq mi (76.2/km).  The racial makeup of the CDP was 99.07% White, 0.16% Black or African American, 0.08% Native American, 0.31% Asian, 0.16% from other races, and 0.23% from two or more races.  1.79% of the population were Hispanic or Latino of any race.
There were 433 households, 38.6% had children under the age of 18 living with them, 80.4% were married couples living together, 4.4% had a female householder with no husband present, and 13.4% were non-families. 10.4% of households were made up of individuals, and 4.4% were one person aged 65 or older.  The average household size was 2.97 and the average family size was 3.19.

The age distribution was 27.8% under the age of 18, 9.0% from 18 to 24, 29.7% from 25 to 44, 25.3% from 45 to 64, and 8.2% 65 or older.  The median age was 37 years. For every 100 females, there were 107.9 males.  For every 100 females age 18 and over, there were 100.2 males.

The median household income was $51,000 and the median family income  was $54,167. Males had a median income of $40,583 versus $28,533 for females. The per capita income for the CDP was $19,052.  About 5.4% of families and 8.1% of the population were below the poverty line, including 14.0% of those under age 18 and none of those age 65 or over.

References 

Census-designated places in Lancaster County, Pennsylvania
Census-designated places in Pennsylvania